The Malcolm X Jazz Suite is a studio album by American jazz trumpeter Terence Blanchard. The album was released on April 20, 1993 via Columbia.

Background
Blanchard acted as the composer and orchestrator for Spike Lee's last two films: Jungle Fever and Malcolm X. Blanchard took the strongest themes from the latter movie and rearranged them for the present jazz quintet sessions. Bassist Tarus Mateen, tenor saxophonist Sam Newsome, pianist Bruce Barth, and drummer Troy Davis each also participated in the original Malcolm X project. In 1994, the album was nominated for Soul Train Music Award for Best Jazz Album.

Critical reception
Scott Yanow of Allmusic stated "Trumpeter Terence Blanchard continues to grow and develop with each year. He wrote the score for Malcolm X and this set finds him exploring 11 of his themes from the movie with his quintet...  Many moods are explored and the fresh material really invigorates the quintet. Newsome's Trane-isms blend well with Blanchard (whose range has become quite impressive) and the performances (which easily stand apart from the film) are quite memorable. It's one of Terence Blachard's finest recordings." David Hajdu of Entertainment Weekly added "Most important, like the rarest of movie music (including the classic jazz soundtracks by Eddie Sauter), The Malcolm X Jazz Suite looks fine without the movie".

David Hajdu of Entertainment Weekly noted "Adapted from his music for Spike Lee’s Malcolm X, this ambitious suite by young trumpeter Terence Blanchard evokes both X generations: Malcolm’s, by mimicking — I mean, paying homage to — the brooding, modal, small-band jazz that Miles Davis was making at the time of Malcolm’s rise; and Blanchard’s, by meandering along without much regard for structural tradition." Zan Stewart of The Los Angeles Times commented "Do tunes taken from a movie score serve as a solid basis for a thematic quintet album? Not always, as trumpeter-composer Blanchard's latest project illustrates".

Track listing

Personnel
Bruce Barth – piano
Terence Blanchard – composer, producer, trumpet
Troy Davis – drums
Tarus Mateen – bass
Sam Newsome – sax (tenor)

Production
Joel Zimmerman – art direction, design 
Robin Burgessco – producer
James P. Nichols – engineer 
Dr. George Butler – executive producer
Robin Burgess – management 
Hans Neleman – photography

Chart performance

References

External links

1993 albums
Terence Blanchard albums
Columbia Records albums
Cultural depictions of Malcolm X